Christina Ashcroft (born 28 June, 1964) is a Canadian sport shooter.

Ashcroft participated in the Summer Olympics in 1984, 1988 and 1992.

She participated at the 1994 Commonwealth Games winning a gold medal in the 50m rifle, three positions pairs event and bronze medals in the 10m Air Rifle pairs, 50m Rifle 3 Position individual and 50m Rifle Prone pairs events. Ashcroft also won two gold medals in the 10m Air Rifle pairs and 50m Rifle 3 Position pairs events and a silver medal in the 50m Rifle Prone pairs event at the 1998 Commonwealth Games.

She won a silver medal at the 1991 Pan American Games in the Small Bore 50 metre rifle prone event and a bronze at the 1999 Pan American Games in the 50 metre rifle, three positions event.

References

1964 births
Living people
Canadian female sport shooters
Commonwealth Games gold medallists for Canada
Commonwealth Games silver medallists for Canada
Commonwealth Games bronze medallists for Canada
Shooters at the 1994 Commonwealth Games
Shooters at the 1998 Commonwealth Games
Commonwealth Games medallists in shooting
Pan American Games silver medalists for Canada
Pan American Games bronze medalists for Canada
Shooters at the 1991 Pan American Games
Shooters at the 1999 Pan American Games
Shooters at the 1984 Summer Olympics
Shooters at the 1988 Summer Olympics
Shooters at the 1992 Summer Olympics
Pan American Games medalists in shooting
Olympic shooters of Canada
Medalists at the 1991 Pan American Games
Medalists at the 1999 Pan American Games
21st-century Canadian women
20th-century Canadian women
Medallists at the 1994 Commonwealth Games
Medallists at the 1998 Commonwealth Games